Putnam County Courthouse may refer to:

 Putnam County Courthouse (Florida), Palatka, Florida
 Putnam County Courthouse (Georgia), Eatonton, Georgia, one of Georgia's county courthouses
 Putnam County Courthouse (Illinois), Hennepin, Illinois
 Putnam County Courthouse (New York), Carmel, New York
 Putnam County Courthouse (Ohio), Ottawa, Ohio
 Putnam County Courthouse (West Virginia), Winfield, West Virginia